Floren Delbene (1898 – 1978 in Buenos Aires) was an Argentine film actor of the Golden Age of Argentine Cinema.

Ferreyra began acting for film in 1926 and made some 60 film appearances between then and his retirement in 1969  appearing in films such as Amalia and Ayúdame a Vivir in 1936 and Besos Brujos often working alongside Libertad Lamarque. He was one of the leading Argentine actors of the 1930s and 1940s, playing the classic tall, dark and handsome leading gentleman in film.

Selected filmography
 Amalia (1936)
 Ayúdame a Vivir (1936)
 Santos Vega (1936)
 Besos Brujos (1937)
 Paths of Faith (1938)
 Ambition (1939)
 An Evening of Love (1943)
 The Three Rats (1946)
 La senda oscura (1947)
 Juan Moreira (1948)
 Dance of Fire (1949)
 The Age of Love (1954)

External links
 

1898 births
1978 deaths
Argentine male film actors
People from Buenos Aires
Burials at La Chacarita Cemetery